Anthiyur is a legislative assembly, that includes the town, Anthiyur and other neighbouring local bodies. Its State Assembly Constituency number is 105. It is a part of the Erode Lok Sabha constituency. The constituency is in existence since 1962 election. Anthiyur was a part of Gobichettipalayam Lok Sabha constituency until 2009 election. It is one of the 234 State Legislative Assembly Constituencies in Tamil Nadu.

Demographics
Kongu Vellalar Gounder, vanniyar, Aruththathiyar, Senguntha Mudaliar, Devanga Chettiyar, Muslims and Adi Dravida communities are populated in this constituency.

Madras State

Tamil Nadu 

Note: From 1967 to 1971, Andhiyur was not listed as a (SC) constituency.

Election results

2021

2016

2011

2006

2001

1996

1991

1989

1984

1980

1977

1971

1967

1962

References 

 

Assembly constituencies of Tamil Nadu
Erode district